Charles Noell is an American businessman and racehorse owner.

In 1992, he founded JMI Equity. Noell purchased Ardbraccan House in County Meath in 2013 for €4.9m. Ardbraccan House is the base of Merriebelle Stable, a horse racing stable he co-owns with John Jay Moores. He's a keen fox hunter.

In December 2015, he was reported to be interested in co-purchasing Everton F.C.

References 

Businesspeople from Baltimore
University of North Carolina alumni
Harvard Business School alumni
American racehorse owners and breeders
Living people
Year of birth missing (living people)